His Worship Michael Moyle was the High Bailiff of the Isle of Man beginning in 2002. He was the head stipendiary magistrate until he retired on 30 January 2010.

References

Living people
Manx people
Year of birth missing (living people)